The Telemann-Werke-Verzeichnis (Telemann Works Catalogue), abbreviated TWV, is the numbering system identifying compositions by Georg Philipp Telemann, published by musicologist Martin Ruhnke.

The prefix TWV is generally followed by a genre number, a letter indicating the key (in some cases), and a work number. The genre number indicates the general type or medium of the work. A major key is in upper case, a minor key in lower case.  The second number is the work's number within the genre. For example, Telemann's Concerto polonois in B flat major for strings and basso continuo is TWV 43:B3. His Orchestral suite in D major is TWV 55:D18, and his Overture in G minor is TWV 55:g4.

Vocal works were catalogued in a similar way by Werner Menke in the Telemann-Vokalwerke-Verzeichnis (Telemann Vocal Works Catalogue), abbreviated TVWV. For example, Telemann's Johannes-Passion is TVWV 5:42. His Times of the Day cantata is TVWV 20:39.

Genre numbering

Genres of vocal works are numbered from 1 to 25, and usually prefixed by TVWV. Genres of instrumental works are numbered from 30 to 55.

The genres are numbered as follows:

Vocal music (TVWV)

Sacred vocal (TVWV 1–15) 

 TVWV 1 – Church cantatas
 Church cantatas for occasions of the liturgical year:
 
 Das ist je gewißlich wahr, TWV 1:183 (= BWV 141)
 Gott der Hoffnung erfülle euch, TWV 1:634 (= BWV 218)
 Ich weiß, daß mein Erlöser lebt, TWV 1:877 (= BWV 160)
 Ich will den Kreuzweg gerne gehen, TWV 1:884
 German Magnificat (cantatas) TWV 1:1104–1108
 Siehe, es hat überwunden der Löwe, TWV 1:1328 (= BWV 219)
 Singet dem Herrn ein neues Lied, TWV 1:1342–1345
 So du mit deinem Munde bekennest, TWV 1:1350 (first movement of this cantata, TWV 1:1350/1, reused as BWV 145/b, second movement of cantata Ich lebe, mein Herze, zu deinem Ergötzen, BWV 145)
 Uns ist ein Kind geboren, TWV 1:1451
 Wer ist der, so von Sodom kommt, TWV 1:1585 (first two movements of this cantata reused in the Passion pasticcio Wer ist der, so von Edom kömmt)

 TVWV 2 – Cantatas for consecrations 
 Cantatas for consecrations
 

 TVWV 3 – Cantatas for the ordination of preachers 
 Cantatas for the ordination of preachers

 TVWV 4 – Cantatas for funerals
 Cantatas for funerals

 TVWV 5 – Passion oratorios and Passions
 Passion oratorios and Passions:
 
 Mich vom Stricke meiner Sünden, TWV 5:1 = Telemann's Brockes Passion

 TVWV 6 – Sacred oratorios
 Sacred oratorios:
 Der Tag des Gerichts, TWV 6:8

 TVWV 7 – Psalms
 Psalms:
 Psalm 96: Singet dem Herrn ein neues Lied, TWV 7:30.

 TVWV 8 – Motets
 Motets:
 Ein feste Burg ist unser Gott, TWV 8:7
 Jauchzet dem Herrn alle Welt, TWV 8:10 (= BWV Anh. 160)

 TVWV 9 – Masses, Magnificat, and individual works
 Masses, Magnificat, and individual works

 TVWV 10 – Collections
 Collections

 TVWV 11 – Cantatas and serenades for weddings
 Cantatas and serenades for weddings

 TVWV 12 – Compositions for birthdays
 Compositions for birthdays
 

 TVWV 13 – Works for political celebrations
 Works for political celebrations

 TVWV 14 – Compositions for schools in Hamburg and Altona
 Compositions for schools in Hamburg and Altona

 TVWV 15 – Oratorios and serenades for the Mayor
 Oratorios and serenades for the Mayor:

Secular vocal (TVWV 20–25) 

 TVWV 20 – Secular cantatas
 Secular cantatas

 TVWV 21 – Operas and arias
 Operas and arias

 TVWV 22 – Contributions to operas by other composers
Contributions to operas by other composers

 TVWV 23 – Prologues for operas
 Prologues for operas

 TVWV 24 – Secular oratorios
 Secular oratorios
 Hamburger Admiralitätsmusik, TWV 24:1

 TVWV 25 – Pedagogical works, odes and songs
Pedagogical works, odes and songs

Instrumental music (TWV) 
Mixed collections:
  (includes works listed in TWV 32 and 40–41, and works by other composers, e.g. BWV 1074)
  (includes works listed in TWV 32 and 41–42)
 Tafelmusik (includes works listed in TWV 41–43, 50 and 53–55)

Music for keyboard instruments and lute (TWV 30–39) 

 TWV 30 – Fugues for keyboard
 Fugues for keyboard

 TWV 31 – Chorale preludes
 Chorale preludes
  (includes BWV Anh. 56 = TWV 31:8)

 TWV 32 – Suites for harpsichord
Suites for harpsichord:
 (BWV 840, "Courante", is its 2nd movement, formerly attributed to Bach)
 (= BWV 824, No. 47 in Klavierbüchlein für Wilhelm Friedemann Bach)

 TWV 33 – Fantasies, sonatas, concertos for harpsichord
 Fantasies, sonatas, concertos for harpsichord

 TWV 34 – Minuets for harpsichord
 Minuets for harpsichord

 TWV 35 – Individual pieces for harpsichord
 Individual pieces for harpsichord (Einzelstücke)

 TWV 36 – Collection of manuscripts
 Collection of manuscripts (Sammelhandschrift)

 TWV 37 – Lustiger Mischmasch
 Lustiger Mischmasch

 TWV 39 – Works for lute
 Works for lute

 Chamber music (TWV 40–45) 

 TWV 40 – Chamber music without basso continuo
 Chamber music without basso continuo
 12 Fantasias for Solo Flute, TWV 40:2–13
 12 Fantasias for Solo Violin, TWV 40:14–25
 12 Fantasias for Viola da Gamba, TWV 40:26–37
 Six Sonates sans basse, TWV 40:101–106
 Six Canonical Sonatas, TWV 40:118–123
 
 Sei Duetti per due Flauti, TWV 40:130–135
 
 Concertos for Four Violins, TWV 40:201–204

 TWV 41 – Chamber music for 1 instrument with basso continuo
 Chamber music for 1 instrument with basso continuo
 

 TWV 42 – Chamber music for 2 instruments with basso continuo
 Chamber music for 2 instruments with basso continuo

 TWV 43 – Chamber music for 3 instruments with basso continuo
 Chamber music for 3 instruments with basso continuo
 Paris quartets TWV 44 – Chamber music for 4 or more instruments with basso continuo
 Chamber music for 4 or more instruments with basso continuo

 TWV 45 – Polish dances from the Rostock manuscript

 Music for orchestra (TWV 50–55) 

 TWV 50 – Symphonies, divertimenti, marches
 Symphonies, divertimenti, marches

 TWV 51 – Concertos for solo instrument and orchestra
 Concertos for solo instrument and orchestra:
 Viola Concerto in G major, TWV 51:G9
  (arranged by Bach for solo harpsichord as )
 

 TWV 52 – Concertos for 2 instruments and orchestra
 Concertos for 2 instruments and orchestra:
 Concerto for 2 violas in G major, TWV 52:G3

 TWV 53 – Concertos for 3 instruments and orchestra
Concertos for 3 instruments and orchestra

 TWV 54 – Concertos for 4 or more instruments and orchestra
Concertos for 4 or more instruments and orchestra

 TWV 55 – Orchestral suites
 Orchestral suites:
 Hamburger Ebb' und Fluth, TWV 55:C3 = Water Music (Telemann)
 
 

Notes

References
Werner Menke: Thematisches Verzeichnis der Vokalwerke von Georg Philipp Telemann.
Band 1. Vittorio Klostermann, Frankfurt 1983, 
Band 2. Vittorio Klostermann, Frankfurt 1983, 
Martin Ruhnke: Georg Philipp Telemann: Thematisch-Systematisches Verzeichnis seiner Werke''.
Band 1. Bärenreiter, Kassel 1984, 
Band 2. Bärenreiter, Kassel 1992, 
Band 3. Bärenreiter, Kassel 1999,

External links 
Book Review: Georg Philipp Telemann: Thematisch-Systematisches Verzeichnis seiner Werke
MuseData Editions of Telemann's Works

Georg Philip Telemann Catalogue TWV (French)

Classical music catalogues
Georg Philipp Telemann